The Alstom Aventra (sold as the Bombardier Aventra until 2021) is a family of electric multiple unit (EMU) passenger trains produced in the United Kingdom originally by Bombardier Transportation and later by Alstom as a successor to the Bombardier Electrostar. A large proportion of its design is based on the Electrostar, adding new technologies and achieving compliance with more stringent requirements and operator demands.

Bombardier began developing the Aventra in 2009 based on feedback from train operating companies (TOCs) and upcoming regulation changes. It has been designed to provide a generic platform for conducting inter-regional, commuter, metro, and high-speed passenger services. It has been claimed to be more efficient and flexible than the Electrostar, which was mainly achieved via the greater use of digital technology. The first order for the Aventra came from the Crossrail programme. Numerous other operators have since ordered the type, including London Overground, Greater Anglia, South Western Railway, c2c and West Midlands Trains. The development of a bi-mode version of the Aventra, incorporating batteries, has also been proposed by Bombardier as a replacement for existing diesel multiple-units.

Description
The Aventra was developed by Bombardier Transportation principally as a successor to their prolific Electrostar electric multiple unit (EMU) family, the final example of which was delivered during 2018 after nearly twenty years of continuous production. According to Neil Simmons, Bombardier's Head of Bids Engineering, development work on what would become the Aventra had begun as early as 2009, although its design had significantly evolved during this time in response to the feedback gathered from various train operating companies. The platform was to be made adaptable to serve various subsections of the passenger rail market, including inter-regional, commuter, metro, and high-speed services. Furthermore, the introduction of increasingly stringent regulations had driven a need either to extensively redesign the Electrostar, or to develop a replacement family. Bombardier has reportedly invested in excess of £50million into the development of the Aventra.

In comparison with the Electrostar, the Aventra has been designed to be lighter and more energy-efficient, with greater flexibility. It has also been claimed to provide greater levels of comfort and reliability. Among the differences in the design are various measures to improve operational efficiency, including the adoption of wider gangways and doors to shorten station dwell times by speeding up passenger boarding; the gangway has reportedly been designed to allow better use of the interior space and ease of movement throughout the train. The Aventra features a redesigned interior, which Bombardier has indicated to be the main visual difference between the two platforms.

A major area of divergence between the two platforms is the greater use of digital technology on board the Aventra platform, partly in response to operators' requests, such as the train control management system. The platform also uses predictive maintenance instead of traditional prescriptive maintenance. Far more reporting information spanning more functionality is generated by the Aventra than on the previous Electrostar family. The signalling apparatus supports the European Rail Traffic Management System (ERTMS).

Structurally, the Aventra is relatively lightweight, the body of each carriage having been redeveloped from the Electrostar. It comprises various welded assemblies that attached to one another via bolts. The vehicle also incorporate the FlexxEco bogie, previously used in service on other Bombardier trainsets, such as the Voyager and some of the later-built Turbostars. While the older Electrostar family are not compliant with the Technical Standards of Interoperability (TSI) introduced in 2017, the Aventra was specifically designed for compliance with the more rigorous regulatory requirements.

This bi-mode trainset, which may incorporate batteries, would be a potential successor to several older diesel multiple-units, such as the Bombardier Turbostar and Voyager platforms.

The primary manufacturing site for the Aventra has been established at Bombardier's Derby Litchurch Lane Works facility; Simmons has stated that the Derby production line is intended to manufacture the type not only to fulfil British orders but also those placed by overseas operators. Each operator can choose to customise the design of its Aventra fleet; common variations have included different vehicle lengths, modified propulsion systems, and interior changes. Much of the onboard equipment has been designed to be flexible and upgradable. Some customers, such as the London Overground, have intentionally stylised their Aventra's interiors to maintain a high degree of commonality with their existing Electrostar fleets.

In November 2021, Alstom signed a memorandum of understanding with Eversholt Rail Group to build 10 three-car hydrogen multiple units.

Orders
As of October 2022, over 2,600 vehicles have been ordered for six operators:

Crossrail
The first order for the Aventra platform was a £1billion contract for 65 Class 345 nine-car EMUs (with an option for 17 more) for the London Crossrail programme, which built the Elizabeth line. These are operated by Elizabeth line concession holder MTR Crossrail and have replaced Class 315, Class 360 and Class 387 on Shenfield Metro, Heathrow and Reading services respectively. In July 2017, it was announced that the order would be increased to 70 trains; the contract for the additional trains was signed in March 2018.

London Overground

London Overground has ordered 54 four-car trains (Class 710), with an option remaining for 15 more, similar to those being used for Crossrail. They have replaced Class 315, Class 317, Class 172 and Class 378 or the entire fleet in 2019 on Lea Valley, Gospel Oak and Watford DC lines and are operated by London Overground concession holder Arriva Rail London.

Greater Anglia

In August 2016, Greater Anglia was awarded the new East Anglia franchise, and announced an order with Bombardier for Class 720 units, formed of 22 ten-car trains and 89 five-car trains (665 carriages) as part of a full fleet replacement programme. They are to replace the Class 317, Class 321, Class 360 and Class 379s. Greater Anglia amended the order with all to be built as five-car sets.

South Western Railway
On 20 June 2017, Bombardier was awarded a contract to build 750 cars for South Western Railway (SWR). The Class 701 units will be formed into 30 five-car and 60 ten-car sets and replace SWR's 455, 456, 458 and 707 suburban fleet.

West Midlands Trains
On 17 October 2017, Bombardier was selected to build a total of 81 Class 730 EMU units (333 carriages) for West Midlands Trains. These will be formed into three separate types; 48 three-car units, and 36 five-car units.

c2c
In December 2017, c2c ordered six ten-car Aventra units, to come into service in summer 2021. These will replace six 4-car  units leased from 2016. In 2020 the order was amended to be for 12 five-car units instead, mirroring the change made by Greater Anglia to their order.

Alstom Aventra variants

References

Bombardier Transportation multiple units
Train-related introductions in 2017